Nong Pa Khrang is a tambon (subdistrict) of Mueang Chiang Mai District, in Chiang Mai Province, Thailand. In 2005 it had a population of 8,423 people. The tambon contains seven mubans (villages).

References

Tambon of Chiang Mai province
Populated places in Chiang Mai province